Bernard Trappey (July 15, 1895 – November 5, 1994) was an American politician. He served as a Democratic member of the Louisiana State Senate.

Life and career 
Trappey was a member of the New Iberia Board of Trustees.

In 1949, Trappey was elected to the Louisiana State Senate, serving until 1952. 

Trappey died in November 1994, at the age of 99.

References 

1895 births
1994 deaths
Democratic Party Louisiana state senators
20th-century American politicians